Dalia Alcocer (born 2 January 2004) is a Mexican rhythmic gymnast, member of the national senior group.

Career 
Dalia took up rhythmic gymnastics at age 3. She debuted as a member of the national team in 2019 at the 1st Junior World Championships in Moscow, competing with ball and taking 41st place in qualification.

In 2022 Alcocer was included into the national senior group, debuting at the World Cup in Portimão, being 4th in the All-Around and winning two historical medals, the first in the circuit for the country: bronze with 5 hoops and gold with 3 ribbons and 2 balls. A week later, in Pesaro, they took 7th place in the All-Around and 5th in both event finals. In July she competed at the Pan American Championships in Rio de Janeiro, winning silver in the All-Around and with 5 hoops and gold with 3 ribbons and 2 balls. A month later she was in Cluj-Napoca with the group for the last World Cup of the year, ending 4th in the All-Around and with 5 hoops as well as 6th with 3 ribbons and 2 balls. In September Dalia represented Mexico along Nicole Cejudo, Sofia Flores, Adirem Tejeda and Kimberly Salazar at the World Championships in Sofia, taking 6th place in the All-Around, 6th with 5 hoops and 8th with 3 ribbons and 2 balls.

Achievements 

 Part of the first group that was awarded a medal in the World Cup circuit when she won bronze in Portimão in 2022.
 Part of the first group that was awarded a gold medal in the World Cup circuit in Portimão in 2022.

References 

2004 births
Living people
Mexican rhythmic gymnasts
Sportspeople from Mérida, Yucatán